KCVS is a Christian radio station licensed to Salina, Kansas, broadcasting on 91.7 MHz FM. The station serves the areas of Salina, Kansas, McPherson, Kansas, and Abilene, Kansas, and is owned by VCY America.

Programming
KCVS's programming includes Christian Talk and Teaching programming including; Crosstalk, Worldview Weekend with Brannon Howse, Grace to You with John MacArthur, In Touch with Dr. Charles Stanley, Love Worth Finding with Adrian Rogers, Revive Our Hearts with Nancy Leigh DeMoss, The Alternative with Tony Evans, Liberty Council's Faith and Freedom Report, Thru the Bible with J. Vernon McGee, Joni and Friends, Unshackled!, and Moody Radio's Stories of Great Christians.

KCVS also airs a variety of vocal and instrumental traditional Christian Music, as well as children's programming such as Ranger Bill.

History
The station began broadcasting in 1994. The station was owned by North Central Kansas Broadcasting and aired a religious format that was previously heard on KCVS 104.9. In 1997, the station was sold to VCY America for $260,000.

See also
 VCY America
 Vic Eliason
 List of VCY America Radio Stations

References

External links
 VCY America official website
 

CVS
Radio stations established in 1994
1994 establishments in Kansas
VCY America stations